Bidayuh is the collective name for several indigenous groups found in southern Sarawak, Malaysia and northern West Kalimantan, Indonesia, on the island of Borneo, which are broadly similar in language and culture (see also issues below). The name Bidayuh means 'inhabitants of land'. Originally from the western part of Borneo, the collective name Land Dayak was first used during the period of Rajah James Brooke, the White Rajah of Sarawak. At times, they were also lesser referred to as Klemantan people. They constitute one of the main indigenous groups in Sarawak and West Kalimantan and live in towns and villages around Kuching and Serian in the Malaysian state of Sarawak, while in the Indonesian province of West Kalimantan they are mainly concentrated in the northern Sanggau Regency. In Sarawak, most of Bidayuh population can be found within 40 km of the geographical area known as Greater Kuching, within the Kuching and Serian Division. They are the second-largest Dayak ethnic group in Sarawak after the Iban and one of the major Dayak tribes in West Kalimantan.

Settlement areas 

Predominantly Bidayuh areas in Sarawak are Lundu, Bau, Penrissen, Padawan, Siburan, and Serian. Most Bidayuh villages can be found in the rural areas of Lundu, Bau, Padawan, Penrissen, and Serian district. The area continues up to the adjacent West Kalimantan border, where they reside in Kembayan, Noyan, Sekayam, and Jangkang district in Sanggau Regency. The area in which they live is mainly in the basin of the Sarawak River and hilly to a mountainous forest, traditionally worked by rotational agriculture and hunting based around farms populated from parent villages situated on the hills for protection. Today, almost all the traditional longhouse villages have been replaced by individual houses, by roads and there are some plantation agriculture and a reduced emphasis on the growing of hill padi. Fruit trees, especially Durian, remain important property markers. The distinctive architectural and cultural feature of the Bidayuh is the head-house, now adopted as a symbol.

Languages 

There are approximately 25 dialects of Bidayuh (Land Dayak) spoken in Sarawak, Malaysia, which can be grouped into four clusters of dialects: Eastern, Central, Highland, and Western. In Sarawak, there are generally said to be three main linguistic groupings (Biatah, Singai-Jagoi, and Bukar–Sadong), but these can be broken down even beyond the list referenced below as most people can be distinguished by locals down to village level through smaller differences in vocabulary and intonation. Each area speaks its own dialect:

 Lundu speaks Jagoi, Salako, and Lara.
 Bratak, Singai, Krokong, and Jagoi speak Singai-Jagoi.
 Penrissen speaks Bisitang while people in Kampung Bunuk speak Bunuk (Segu-Benuk).
 Siburan vicinity speaks Biatah.
 Bidayuhs who live around Serian such as Tebakang, Mongkos, Tebedu to Tanjung Amo near the border of Kalimantan Indonesia speak Sadong.
 Bidayuhs who live around Serian such as Baki, Baru, Taee, and Tarat speaks the Bukar language.
 Bidayuhs in Padawan speak several but related dialects like Bi-Annah, Pinyawa, Braang, Bia''', Bisepug, and Emperoh/Bipuruh.
 Bidayuh Moden speaks mixed languages, mixed languages between Padawan and Jagoi language (Semeba, Tematu, Bumbok, and Sudad).
The dialects are not mutually intelligible and English or Malay are often used as common languages.

 Linguistic issues 

The Serian Bidayuhs have a distinct dialect known as Bukar–Sadong, which is not intelligible to Bidayuhs from other Districts. Here are some examples of the differences in the various dialects spoken in Serian, with their English and Malay equivalents. Also included are two Philippine languages, Kapampangan and Tagalog:

 Religion and beliefs 

Bidayuhs are traditionally animist or pagans, and vestiges of these beliefs remain. The Brooke family era saw the arrival of Christian missionaries from 1848, bringing education and modern medicine, while a similar process also took place in Dutch Borneo on the Dutch controlled side. The great majority of Bidayuh are now Christians, majority of them being Roman Catholic. Almost 70% of the people of Bidayuh have changed their traditional name to English name since they converted to Christianity and many young indigenous Bidayuh in Sarawak do not practice their traditional ceremonies anymore, weakening their culture as indigenous peoples of Sarawak. The Bidayuh people are the closest relative of the Melanau people and are said to have the same ancestor before splitting into different tribes. The original Bidayuhs are mainly pagans or animists, however, at 50% has converted to Christianity. They would have big festivals like the Gawai Dayak, which is a celebration to please the padi spirit for a good harvest.

Most Bidayuh villages have either a Roman Catholic or Anglican church or a mosque. The Biatah people, who live in the Kuching area, are Anglican, while the people of the Bau area are Catholic.

Some renowned church also being established in some villages such as SIB (Sidang Injil Borneo) also called as Borneo Evangelical Church, Baptist Church, Assemblies Of God church, and other churches as SDA, Latter Rain.

The Bidayuh of Bukar had a unique tradition of hanging the bodies of the dead on trees and leaving them to rot away. The skeletons are left on trees as a reminder of the dead. The tradition is rarely practiced nowadays.

The Bidayuh or Klemantan celebrates Gawai Padi (Paddy Festival) or Gawai Adat Naik Dingo (Paddy Storing Festival).

 Salako and Lara people 

Although classified as "Bidayuh" by the Malaysian government, the Salako and Lara culture have little resemblance to other Bidayuh groups and their oral tradition claims different descent and migration histories. Linguistically, the Salako belong to another language family tree which is of the Malayic Dayak family (the same family as the Iban). The Lara, although said to be more related to the Bidayuh (Jagoi-Singai), speak a language almost not mutually intelligible at all with the Bidayuh but belonged to the same language family tree which is the Land Dayak. Even their customary rituals and rites differ from the other Bidayuhs (all Bidayuhs share almost the same ritual and customary rites).

 Culture 

 Musical heritage 

The Bidayuh have a musical heritage consisting of various types of agung ensembles - ensembles composed of large hanging, suspended or held, bossed/knobbed gongs which act as a drone without any accompanying melodic instrument. They also use a bamboo idiochord tube zither called pratuokng.

 Traditional dance 
 Ngiyar

Traditional cuisine
Several traditional Bidayuh dishes are:
 Tempoyak goreng, fried fermented durian with pork and lemongrass condiment
 Rotung, sago cooked in bamboo
 Kubar, sweet sago pancakes
 , sticky sago paste
 Manok pansoh, chicken and tapioca leaves cooked and served in a bamboo stalk
 Tobah, preserved wild animal meat or pork, and fish

Notable Bidayuhs
 Cornelis, former governor of West Kalimantan.
 Anding Indrawani Zaini, an Akademi Fantasia'' star, model, actor and singer. He is of mixed Melanau-Bidayuh parentage.
 Bonnie Bunyau Gustin, national powerlifter who won Malaysia's first ever gold medal in the sport in the men's 72 kg event at the 2020 Summer Paralympics in Tokyo, breaking the Paralympic record in the process.
 Bryan Nickson Lomas, former Malaysian national diving athlete. He was the youngest Malaysian athlete to qualify for 2004 Summer Olympics when he was 14.
 Dewi Liana Seriestha, Miss World 2014 Top 25 and Miss Talent for Miss World Beauty Pageant. She is of mixed Bidayuh-Indonesian parentage.
 James Dawos Mamit, former Malaysian cabinet deputy minister.
 Pandelela Rinong, Malaysian national diving athlete.
 Made Katib, former Anglican bishop of the Diocese of Kuching.
 Michael Manyin Jawong, former Sarawak cabinet minister.
 Richard Riot Jaem, first ethnic Bidayuh to be appointed as a minister in the Malaysian cabinet.
 Tony Eusoff, actor and model.
 Venice Elphi, Malaysian football player, played for ATM FA.

References

Notations

 Baruk Dayak
 Patrick Rigep Nuek (2002). The Dayak Bidayuh Community: Rituals, Ceremonies, and Festivals.

External links 
 Ethnologue language tree
 The Bidayuh Language: Yesterday, Today and Tomorrow Book on the Bidayuh language available for purchase from SIL, or freely downloadable from SIL: free access
 Atur Simayang Mass: The Holy Eucharist in Bukar Anglican eucharistic liturgy digitised by Richard Mammana

Ethnic groups in Sarawak
Ethnic groups in Indonesia
Dayak people